Benedicta may refer to:

 Benedicta Henrietta of the Palatinate (1652–1730), a German princess
 Benedicta Ajudua (born 1980), Nigerian sprinter
 Benedicta Arts Center, a performing arts center
 Caterina Benedicta Grazianini (1685–1715), composer
 Benedicta Boccoli, an Italian actress
 Benedicta de Oliveira (1927–2020), Brazilian sprinter
Benedicta van Minnen, South African MP

See also

 Benedict (disambiguation)
 Benedicto
 Benedictum
 Benedictus (disambiguation)

Feminine given names